Luke Curtin (born September 23, 1977) is an American former professional ice hockey player. He was selected by the Colorado Avalanche in the 4th round (134th overall) of the 1996 NHL Entry Draft. Curtin predominantly played in the ECHL and in November 2010, he was named to the 12-man ECHL All-Decade Team, which honored the best ECHL players from 2000–01 through the 2009–10 ECHL season. In 2011 Curtin was inducted into the ECHL Hall of Fame.

Career statistics

Awards and honors

References

External links

1977 births
Atlantic City Boardwalk Bullies players
Baton Rouge Kingfish players
Bridgeport Sound Tigers players
Colorado Avalanche draft picks
Fresno Falcons players
Grand Rapids Griffins players
Hershey Bears players
Kelowna Rockets players
Living people
Long Beach Ice Dogs (IHL) players
Milwaukee Admirals players
Portland Pirates players
Providence Bruins players
San Antonio Rampage players
Tacoma Rockets players
Tacoma Sabercats players
Ice hockey players from Minnesota
American men's ice hockey left wingers